WMCE-FM (88.5 FM) is a non-commercial classic hits radio station in Erie, Pennsylvania, owned and operated by Lake Erie College of Osteopathic Medicine. WMCE-FM was simulcast on sister station WMCE 1530 AM until its sale on September 1, 2017. The transmitter is located near Knoyle Rd and Dewey Rd outside of Erie.

History

Formation - WMCY
After Mercyhurst acquired the frequency, 88.5 first signed on as WMCY on February 3, 1989. It was a mixed format station broadcasting classic rock, Broadway musicals, talk programs and more. It eventually switched to Opera and classical and then changed formats again in January 2009 to nearly exclusively Jazz music.

JAZZ FM
Under the direction of station manager Mike Leal, the station switched to Jazz programming in January 2009. Content was provided by local hosts, and weekly regional shows. Programs included Jazz at Lincoln Center, Jazz Profiles, Jazz Variations, Radio Deluxe, European Jazz Stage, Latin Jazz Perspectives, Blues Before Sunrise, Juke in the Back, Blues and Beyond, Frank's Place, Swingin' Down The Lane and The Jazz Scene. Jazz hosts included Bob Protzman, Mark Richard, Helen Wigger, Tony Mowod, Bill Hillgrove. Additional programming was streamed using satellite services.

"The Greatest Hits of all Time"
Under the management of Dan Geary, WMCE changed formats to Classic Hits in January 2013. The station and features many more local hosts and less syndicated programming. Hosts on WMCE now include former Erie radio & TV personalities.

Captain Dan, hosting Erie morning radio for over 32 years is still in charge of the morning drive in Erie. Johnny Holiday, an Erie radio legend host middays. Afternoon drive and the is managed by Commander Bill.  The Commander is followed by the Dr. Denny Woytek.
Weekends are handled by John "Harada Data" Harada, Teri Bohn and Mighty Mike Langer. Johnny Holiday also handles Saturday evenings and delivers some great tunes in his spotlight hour themes.  Saturday mornings from 9 to noon check out the high energy of ALL THE HITS with Rick Johnson. Sunday mornings from 9 to noon enjoy Bob and Alice Koziel and the Polka Celebration.

WMCE is a broadcast service of Lake Erie College of Osteopathic Medicine (LECOM), said institution having purchased the station in 2018 from Mercyhurst University. The university no longer is connected to WMCE in any way.

Recognizing the station as a valuable community asset, LECOM has retained the talent and the on air format and delivers short and timely messages regarding various topics regarding healthcare services delivered by their institution.

Rest assured the GREATEST HITS OF ALL TIME are alive and well at 88.5FM, and online at LECOMRADIO.COM

In May 2021, WMCE-FM purchased WWCB, a commercially licensed AM radio station based in Corry, Pennsylvania, from its owner Bill Stafford.

Previous logo

References

External links
 - WMCE-FM Lecom Radio Website

MCE-FM
MCE-FM
Radio stations established in 1989
Classic hits radio stations in the United States